Brazilian Australians refers to Australian citizens of Brazilian birth or descent.

According to the 2021 Census, Green Square, New South Wales and Zetland, New South Wales had the highest number of Brazilians living in Sydney.

Over 2% of residents in Zetland were born in Brazil, which is higher than the beachside suburbs of Bondi Beach, Tamarama, Bronte, and Manly.  Over 2% of the residents in Zetland speak Portuguese, and approximately 5% of the residents in Zetland speak Portuguese and Spanish.  This is higher than the suburb of Petersham, which was previously known as the suburb with the highest percentage of Portuguese speakers.

Due to the demographic profile of Green Square, New South Wales, the locality experiences 50% less crime per population than Bondi and 75% less crime per population than Double Bay. Green Square, New South Wales is an affluent inner-city locality with a low crime rate in part due to its 6-star urban design rating, security measures in public areas, high-security apartment buildings, and less movement from people who do not reside in the area.

The 2021 census revealed that residents in the area had the third-highest median personal income in Sydney at $1669 a week, almost 2x higher than the citywide figure of $881 per week. Only Double Bay-Darling Point and North Sydney-Lavender bay had slightly higher median personal incomes at $1690 a week (+1.2% higher) and $1683 a week (+0.8% higher) respectively.

According to the 2021 Census, 46,720 people in Australian were born in Brazil while 24,377 claimed Brazilian ancestry.

According to the Brazilian consulate almost 60,000 Brazilians are living in Australia as of 2020 (making around 0.25% of the country's population).

Brazilian immigration
Although Brazilian migration in the eighteenth and nineteenth and centuries has not been documented, there is evidence of early Brazilian interest in Australia. However, concrete evidence of a Brazilian presence in Australia does not appear until the turn of the twentieth century, when census officials in 1901 counted 105 Brazilian-born in Australia.

Two waves of immigration
The first Brazilian migrants began arriving in Australia in the mid-1970s. They were attracted to Australia by an Australian government assistance scheme. The second wave of migration began in the late 1990s and continues today. It is widely attributed to growing socio-economic power within Brazil since the 1980s and Brazilian's strong desire to learn English. Australia is becoming an appealing destination to learn English after the United States and England.

There has also been an influx of Brazilian students who have come to attend Australian universities. These students come independent of their families on study visas, and usually go home after completion of their studies. Brazilians have become the largest source of international student enrollments in Australia outside of Asia.

Demographics and Statistics
According to the 2021 Census conducted by the Australian Board of Statistics, there were approximately 51,000 people living in Australia who identified as being of Brazilian origin. This was a +200% growth 2011.

Brazil is a country home to various ethnic groups, but the largest ancestries reported in the 2021 census aside from the general 'Brazilian' response were Italian and Portuguese.

Notable Brazilian Australians
Agenor Muniz
Aseem Pereira
Raphael Borges Rodrigues – footballer for Melbourne City FC
Cássio – former footballer for Adelaide United
Caroline Correa
David Harvey
Fernando de Moraes
Glenn McMillan
Gustavo Falciroli
Henrique – former footballer for Brisbane Roar
Heritier Lumumba – former Aussie Rules footballer for Collingwood FC
Mineiro – former 24 time Brazil international
Bernardo Oliveira – footballer for Adelaide United
Wilson da Silva

See also

 African Australians
 Australia–Brazil relations
 Brazilians in the United Kingdom
 European Australians
 Europeans in Oceania
 Hispanic and Latin American Australians
 Immigration to Australia
 Portuguese Australians

References

External links
  [CC-By-SA] (Brazilians in Sydney)

Australia
Latin American Australian
Australia–Brazil relations